The National Museum of Natural Science is a national museum in North District, Taichung, Taiwan.

Overview

The Research and Collection Division of the museum is divided into departments for zoology, botany, geology and anthropology.

The architect and educator Han Pao-teh was appointed as the first director of the museum in 1987, a post he held until 1995. He was involved with helping to set up the museum before that from 1981. The current director is Chuan-Chin Chiao (()).

History
In 1980, the government announced plans to build the museum. On New Year's Day of 1986, the first phase of the museum opened, including the Science Center, Space Theater, administrative offices, and outdoor grounds. The second phase was completed in August 1988, and the third and fourth phases were completed in August 1993. In 1999, the number of specimens in the museum had grown to 551,705.

See also
 List of museums in Taiwan
 Maritime industries of Taiwan

References

External links

 
 Information from ASPAC

1986 establishments in Taiwan
Museums established in 1986
Natural Science
Natural history museums in Taiwan
Museums in Taichung
Science museums in Taiwan